86th Brigade may refer to:

 86th Mixed Brigade, a unit of the Spanish Republican Army
 86th Brigade (United Kingdom)
 86th Infantry Brigade Combat Team, a unit of the United States Army

See also
 86th Division (disambiguation)
 86th Wing (disambiguation)
 86th Regiment (disambiguation)